cloudControl was a European company offering a platform as a service (PaaS) based in Berlin, Germany. Officially supported languages for development and deployment were Java, PHP, Python and Ruby via the open buildpack API originally developed by Heroku.

History 
cloudControl was founded in January 2009 by Philipp Strube, Tobias Wilken and Thomas Ruland in Bonn, Germany. The company moved to the Berlin, Germany area in early 2010 after getting business angel investor funding. Production support for the PHP programming language was announced in October 2010. The company raised venture capital funding August 2011. As a result of this, support for Java, Python and Ruby programming languages started  in October 2012.

dotCloud
In August 2014 it acquired the dotCloud brand from American company Docker, Inc.
dotCloud was a platform as a service company using the open-source Docker software; it was the original developer of Docker.

In January 2016 the company sent out a letter to its customers that it was shutting down.

Bankruptcy
cloudControl went bankrupt in December 2015 and was acquired by Exoscale in March 2016.
The dotCloud service was shut down the same time.

References

External links 
.
dotCloud website (archived)

Cloud platforms